St. Paul's Episcopal, also known as the Church of the Nazarene, is a historic Episcopal church located at Orleans in Jefferson County, New York. The church was built in 1878 and is a small wood frame Queen Anne-style edifice with Gothic Revival details.  A truncated, square engaged bell tower was added in 1908.  The church changed hands to be the Church of the Nazarene about 1900 and was used as such until 1994.

It was listed on the National Register of Historic Places in 1996.

References

Churches on the National Register of Historic Places in New York (state)
Episcopal church buildings in New York (state)
Queen Anne architecture in New York (state)
Carpenter Gothic church buildings in New York (state)
Churches completed in 1878
19th-century Episcopal church buildings
Churches in Jefferson County, New York
National Register of Historic Places in Jefferson County, New York